Harpalus tardus is a black-coloured ground beetle in the Harpalinae subfamily that is common in Europe, Siberia, Central Asia and Northern Asia.

Description and distribution
It likes sandy ground and gravel over which it flies from spring to summer.

References

External links

tardus
Beetles of Asia
Beetles of Europe
Beetles described in 1797
Taxa named by Georg Wolfgang Franz Panzer